Jachatacasirca (possibly from Aymara jach'a big, t'aja tousled, sirka vein of the body or a mine, "big tousled vein") is a  mountain in the Andes of southern Peru. It is situated in the Tacna Region, Tarata Province, on the border of the districts of Susapaya and Ticaco. Jachatacasirca lies northeast of Yanacachi.

References

Mountains of Tacna Region
Mountains of Peru